Stichoplastoris is a genus of Central American tarantulas that was first described by J.-P. Rudloff in 1997.

Species
 it contains eight species, found in Panama, Belize, Costa Rica, and El Salvador:
Stichoplastoris angustatus (Kraus, 1955) – El Salvador
Stichoplastoris asterix (Valerio, 1980) – Costa Rica
Stichoplastoris denticulatus (Valerio, 1980) – Costa Rica
Stichoplastoris elusinus (Valerio, 1980) – Costa Rica
Stichoplastoris longistylus (Kraus, 1955) – El Salvador
Stichoplastoris obelix (Valerio, 1980) (type) – Belize, Costa Rica
Stichoplastoris schusterae (Kraus, 1955) – El Salvador
Stichoplastoris stylipus (Valerio, 1982) – Costa Rica, Panama

See also
 List of Theraphosidae species

References

Theraphosidae genera
Spiders of Central America
Theraphosidae